The Estadio 10 de Abril is a multi-use stadium in Chetumal.  It is currently used mostly for football matches and is the home stadium for Tigrillos de Chetumal  The stadium has a capacity of 5,000 people.

References

Football venues in Mexico
Athletics (track and field) venues in Mexico
Sports venues in Quintana Roo